Ocqueville is a commune in the Seine-Maritime department in the Normandy region in northern France.

Geography

Population

Places of interest
 The château de Catteville, dating from the fifteenth century.
 The château du Merdon.
 The church of St. Vaast, dating from the thirteenth century.
 A sixteenth-century stone cross.

See also
Communes of the Seine-Maritime department

References

Communes of Seine-Maritime